A general election was held in the U.S. state of Vermont on November 8, 2016. All of Vermont's executive officers were up for election as well as Vermont's Class III Senate seat and at-large seat in the United States House of Representatives. Primary elections were held on August 9, 2016.

President of the United States

United States Senate

United States House of Representatives

Governor

Lieutenant Governor

Incumbent Republican Lieutenant Governor Phil Scott (since 2011) ran for Governor.

Republican primary
Randy Brock, former State Auditor (2005-2007) and State Senator (2009-2013), was unopposed in the Republican primary.

Results

Democratic primary

Candidates
Kesha Ram, State Representative
Shap Smith, Speaker of the Vermont House of Representatives
Dave Zuckerman, State Senator, farmer (also ran in Progressive primary)

Results

Progressive primary

Candidates
Boots Wardinski, farmer, activist
Dave Zuckerman, State Senator, farmer (write-in) (also ran in Democratic primary)

Results

Liberty Union nomination
Boots Wardinski ran unopposed for the Liberty Union State Committee's nomination for Lieutenant Governor. He also unsuccessfully ran in the Progressive primary.

General election

Candidates
Randy Brock (R)
Boots Wardinski (LU)
Dave Zuckerman (P/D)

Polling

Results

Secretary of State

Incumbent Democratic Secretary of State Jim Condos (since 2011) ran again for a fourth term.

Democratic primary
Incumbent Jim Condos was unopposed in the Democratic primary.

Results

Liberty Union nomination
Mary Alice Herbert, candidate for Secretary of State in 2012, ran unopposed for the Liberty Union State Committee's nomination for Secretary of State.

General election

Candidates
Jim Condos (D/R)
Mary Alice "Mal" Herbert (LU)

Results

Treasurer

Incumbent Democratic Treasurer Beth Pearce (since 2011) ran again for a fourth term.

Democratic primary

Candidates
Beth Pearce, incumbent (also ran in Republican primary)
Richard Dunne, policy consultant

Results

Republican primary

Candidates
Beth Pearce, incumbent (write-in) (also ran in Democratic primary)
Wendy Wilton, nominee for Treasurer in 2012 (write-in)

Results

Progressive primary

Candidates
Don Schramm, nominee for Treasurer in 2014, 2012, 2010, and 2008 (write-in)

Results

Liberty Union nomination
Murray Ngoima, nominee for Treasurer in 2014, 2010, and 2008, ran unopposed for the Liberty Union State Committee's nomination for Treasurer.

General election

Candidates
Murray Ngoima (LU)
Beth Pearce (D/R)
Don Schramm (P)

Results

Attorney General

Incumbent Democratic Attorney General William Sorrell, the state's longest-serving Attorney General (since 1997), did not run for reelection.

Democratic primary

Candidates
T.J. Donovan, Chittenden County state's attorney
H. Brooke Paige, businessman, perennial candidate (also ran for Governor)

Results

Republican primary
Deborah Bucknam, a private practice attorney, was unopposed in the Republican primary.

Results

Liberty Union nomination
Rosemarie Jackowski, journalist, teacher, activist, nominee for Attorney General in 2014, and 2012, ran unopposed for the Liberty Union State Committee's nomination for Attorney General.

General election

Candidates
Deborah Bucknam (R)
T.J. Donovan (D)
Rosemarie Jackowski (LU)

Polling

Results

Auditor of Accounts

Incumbent Democratic/Progressive Auditor Doug Hoffer (since 2013) ran again for a third term.

Democratic primary
Incumbent Doug Hoffer was unopposed in the Democratic primary. (Also ran in Progressive primary)

Results

Republican primary
Dan Feliciano, strategic policy consultant, Libertarian nominee for Governor in 2014 and 2010, was unopposed in the Republican primary.

Results

Progressive primary
Incumbent Doug Hoffer was unopposed in the Progressive primary. (Also ran in Democratic primary)

Results

Liberty Union nomination
Marina Brown, nominee for Lieutenant Governor in 2014, ran unopposed for the Liberty Union State Committee's nomination for Auditor.

General election

Candidates
Marina Brown (LU)
Dan Feliciano (R)
Doug Hoffer (D/P)

Results

State legislature
All 30 seats in the Vermont Senate and all 150 seats of the Vermont House of Representatives were up for election. The balance of political power before the elections for each chamber was:

Senate

House of Representatives

And the results of the elections for both chambers was:

Senate

House of Representatives

References

 
Vermont